The Wuling Bingo is a battery electric subcompact car manufactured by SAIC-GM-Wuling (SGMW) since 2023 under the Wuling brand.

Overview

Following the Hongguang Mini EV electric microcar, Wuling expanded its range of city cars with a conventional 5-door hatchback called the Bingo.

The Bingo was created for the Chinese domestic market, as a response to other urban electric models. It features retro-inspired styling, distinguished by a round body with oval headlights and rear lamps. The body comes in four colors, three with a contrasting painted roof: white and black, green and black or pink and white, as well as fully black.

The passenger compartment features a similar round-oval design. The dashboard features two displays that function respectively as clocks and the central touch screen of the multimedia system.

Specifications
The Bingo is available with two powertrain variants. The manufacturer has also provided two available sets of batteries: the smaller 17.3 kWh allows the user to drive up to 200 kilometers on a single charge according to the NEDC cycle, and the larger 31.9 kWh up to 330 kilometers.

References

Bingo
Electric city cars
Cars introduced in 2023